The Supreme Council for the Confucian Religion in Indonesia (MATAKIN; Chinese: 印尼孔教總會;  pinyin: yìnní kǒngjiào zǒnghuì) is a Confucian church established in 1955 in Indonesia, comprising the communities of practitioners of Confucianism mostly among Chinese Indonesians. Together with the Hong Kong Confucian Academy it is one of the two branches that formed after the dissolution of mainland China's Confucian Church founded by Kang Youwei in the early 20th century.

Official census (2018) 
According to the 2018 census, there were a total 71,999 of  Confucianism in Indonesia. The percentages of Confucianism in Indonesia 0,03% in 2018.

History
 In 1883, Boen Tjhiang Soe (Wen Chang Ci 文昌祠), after being rebuilt in 1906, became the Boen Bio (Wen Miao 文廟 or Kong Miao 孔廟, "Temple of Culture" or "Temple of Confucius") at Jl. Kapasan No. 131 Surabaya. The colonial Dutch called it Geredja Boen Bio or Geredja Khonghoetjoe, "Church of Confucius" (de Kerk van Confucius). At the present time it is a place of worship for Confucians in Surabaya.
 In 1886, the first book of Confucius History in Indonesian, was published by Lie Kim Hok.
 In 1897, the Four Books were translated in Indonesian by Toean Njio Tjoen Ean and were published in Ambon.
 In 1900, the translation and commentary of Great Learning (Id: Ajaran Besar) and Doctrine of the Mean (Id: Tengah Sempurna) were completed by Tan Ging Tiong.
 On March 17, 1900, led by the social activist Phoa Keng Hek Sia, twenty Chinese-Indonesian community leaders established Tiong Hoa Hwee Koan, a Confucianist social and educational organisation. It aimed to better the educational and social position of ethnic Chinese in the Dutch East Indies, and reform the practice of Confucianism in the Dutch colony.
 In 1918, the Confucian Council of Solo (Khong Kauw Hwee 孔教會) was legally founded.
 In 1923, a congress was held at Yogyakarta, Central Java, which established the Khong Kauw Tjong Hwee (孔教總會), the Central Assembly of Confucianism.
 On April 16, 1955, it was renamed the Supreme Council for the Confucian Religion in Indonesia; Majelis Tinggi Agama Khonghucu Indonesia: MATAKIN).

See also
Confucius
Four Books and Five Classics
Great Learning
Confucianism
Confucian Academy
Confucian church
Confucian ritual religion
Chinese folk religion in Southeast Asia

References

External links
Supreme Council for the Confucian Religion in Indonesia
The History and Legal Position of Confucianism in Post-independence Indonesia

Chinese Indonesian culture
Chinese folk religion in Asia
Confucian organizations
Overseas Chinese organisations
1955 establishments in Indonesia
Religious organizations established in 1955
Religious organizations based in Indonesia
Religious Confucianism